IK Columbia was a Swedish football club located in Vänersborg. Club merged in 1969 with IFK Vänersborg

External links
 IK Columbia – Historical results 

Football clubs in Västra Götaland County